The BBC Albanian Service was a foreign language service of the BBC World Service. It ceased operations on 28 February 2011.

References

Albanian-language radio stations
Albanian service
Radio stations established in 1940
Radio stations disestablished in 1967
Radio stations established in 1993
Radio stations disestablished in 2011
1940 establishments in the United Kingdom
Albania–United Kingdom relations
2011 disestablishments in the United Kingdom
1993 establishments in the United Kingdom
1967 disestablishments in the United Kingdom